Ferro is an Italian and Portuguese surname related to the word ferro ("iron"). People with this surname include:

Andrea Ferro, singer of Italian metal band Lacuna Coil
Carlos Ferro (disambiguation)
Fiona Ferro, French tennis player
Lorenzo Ferro, Argentine actor and musician
Michael Ferro, American politician
Michael W. Ferro, Jr., American inventor and philanthropist
Óscar Ferro, Uruguayan goalkeeper
Pablo Ferro, American graphic designer
Peggy Ferro, American healthcare activist
Raúl Ferro, Uruguayan footballer
Ridolfo Capo Ferro, Italian fencing master
Rita Ferro, Portuguese diplomat
Rita Ferro (writer), Portuguese writer
Robert Ferro, American novelist
Rubén Remigio Ferro, Cuban judge
Scipione del Ferro, Italian mathematician who first discovered the solution to a generic cubic equation
Tiziano Ferro, Italian singer

Italian-language surnames
Spanish-language surnames